Estelle may refer to:

People
 Estelle (given name), a female given name, including a list of people
 Estelle (surname), a list of people
 Estelle (musician), British singer/rapper Estelle Fanta Swaray (born 1980)
 Princess Estelle, Duchess of Östergötland

Fictional characters
 Estelle Blofis, a character in Trials of Apollo by Rick Riordan
 Estelle Bright, a main character in the video game The Legend of Heroes: Trails in the Sky
 Estelle Costanza, on the TV series Seinfeld
 Estelle Leonard, a recurring character in the Friends TV series
 Estelle Green, in Diana Wynne Jones' fantasy novel Witch Week
 Estellise Sidos Heurassein, a main character in the video game Tales of Vesperia
 Estelle, in Jean-Paul Sartre's No Exit

Places
 Estelle (Arrigas), a hamlet in France
 Estelle, a hamlet in France, part of the commune of Saint-Jory, Haute-Garonne
 Estelle, Georgia, United States, an unincorporated community
 Estelle, Louisiana, United States, a census-designated place
 Estelle Mountain, California, United States

Ships
 Estelle Maersk, a container ship
 SV Estelle, a fair trade cargo Bermuda schooner
 USS Estelle (SP-747), a United States Navy patrol boat commissioned in 1917 and stricken in 1933

Other uses

 Hurricane Estelle (disambiguation), several tropical cyclones
 Skoda Estelle, the British name for the Škoda 105/120 car
 A brand name of co-cyprindiol (cyproterone acetate/ethinylestradiol), a combined birth control pill
 A brand name of estetrol/drospirenone, a combined birth control pill

See also
 Estelle v. Gamble, a 1976 US Supreme Court case
 Estelle v. Smith, a 1981 US Supreme Court case
 Estelle v. Williams, a 1976 US Supreme Court case
 Estella (disambiguation)